Jermmas Chuenglertsiri is a Thai female politician who former representative Bangkok (constituency one: Phra Nakhon, Pom Prap Sattru Phai, Samphanthawong) in the House of Representatives.

Jermmas was born on July 14, 1959 in Thai-Chinese family in Bangkok, but she cannot speak or understand Chinese very well. She graduated from Faculty of Political Science, Ramkhamhaeng University and master's degree from National Institute of Development Administration (NIDA).

She started her career as a member of the Bangkok Metropolitan Administration Council (BMC), Pom Prap Sattru Phai (two terms). From the beginning she did not have any interest in politics, but she was persuaded by Ek Chuenglertsiri, her husband, who has been an election canvasser of the Democrat Party since 1988. Ek has helped with the campaign for many Democrat MPs such as Marut Bunnag, Dr. Supachai Panitchpakdi, M.R. Sukhumbhand Paribatra, etc.

Jermmas became the first MP from the 2005 general election and has since been MP since (three terms to the present). By the 2005 election, she was one of four MPs of the Democrat Party in Bangkok (Jermmas Chuenglertsiri, M.L. Apimongkol Sonakul, Korn Chatikavanij, Ong-Ard Klampaiboon respectively). And she was the only Democrat MP in a country that can win the election over the former MP who was under Thai Rak Thai Party.

In 2018 she was one of executive board-of-directors of the Democrat Party.

In the election of a new Democrat Party leader in November 2018, she was appointed as one of the five election commission of the party. In the election on March 24, 2019, she was a candidate for election in Bangkok's one constituency, consisting of Phra Nakhon, Pom Prap Sattru Phai, Samphanthawong and Dusit (except Thanon Nakhon Chai Si). She was not elected when lost to Karnkanit Heawsantati a fellow female politician from the Palang Pracharath Party.

In the election of Bangkok governor on May 22, 2022, where members of the BMC were elected at the same time. Her daughter Nipapan "Gub" Chuenglertsiri was also elected as a representative in Pom Prap Sattru Phai district, considering that she was one of nine members of the Democrat Party elected this time.

References

External links
 

Jermmas Chuenglertsiri
Jermmas Chuenglertsiri
Jermmas Chuenglertsiri
Jermmas Chuenglertsiri
1959 births
Living people
Jermmas Chuenglertsiri
Jermmas Chuenglertsiri
Jermmas Chuenglertsiri